Azlan Johar (born 1963 in Johor) is a former Malaysian striker. He formerly played with Selangor FA, Terengganu FA and ATM FA.

He also the former member of Malaysia national team in 1983–1987.

Honours
Selangor FA
Malaysia Cup: 1986

Malaysia
Pestabola Merdeka: 1986

References

Living people
Malaysian footballers
1963 births
People from Johor
Association football forwards
Selangor FA players